Viktor Nikolayevich Myasnikov (born 3 September 1948) is a retired hurdler who represented the USSR. He won two medals at the European Indoor Championships. Myasnikov trained at Dynamo in Minsk.

Achievements

References

External links

Sports Reference

Russian male hurdlers
Soviet male hurdlers
Dynamo sports society athletes
Athletes (track and field) at the 1972 Summer Olympics
Athletes (track and field) at the 1976 Summer Olympics
Olympic athletes of the Soviet Union
1948 births
Living people